Youngs Creek is an unincorporated community in Greenfield Township, Orange County, in the U.S. state of Indiana.

History
The community's original name was Unionville. Unionville was founded in about 1864, and was renamed Youngs Creek after a nearby stream of the same name when the post office was established. A post office was established at Youngs Creek in 1867, and remained in operation until it was discontinued in 1976.

Geography

References

Unincorporated communities in Orange County, Indiana
Unincorporated communities in Indiana